Tan Kim Bee (4 June 1929 – 2 November 2015) was a Malaysian weightlifter. He competed in the men's middle heavyweight event at the 1956 Summer Olympics.

References

External links
 

1929 births
2015 deaths
Malaysian male weightlifters
Olympic weightlifters of Malaya
Weightlifters at the 1956 Summer Olympics
Place of birth missing
Medalists at the 1958 Asian Games
Asian Games bronze medalists for Malaysia
Weightlifters at the 1958 Asian Games
Asian Games medalists in weightlifting
Commonwealth Games medallists in weightlifting
Commonwealth Games silver medallists for Malaysia
Commonwealth Games bronze medallists for Malaysia
Weightlifters at the 1950 British Empire Games
Weightlifters at the 1958 British Empire and Commonwealth Games
20th-century Malaysian people
Medallists at the 1950 British Empire Games
Medallists at the 1958 British Empire and Commonwealth Games